The Temple of the Ten is a fantasy novel by H. Bedford-Jones and "W. C. Robertson" (believed to be a pseudonym of Bedford-Jones).  It was first published in book form in 1973 by Donald M. Grant, Publisher, Inc. in an edition of 1,000 copies.  The novel originally appeared in the magazine Adventure on March 3, 1921.

Plot introduction
The novel adventures in the realms of Prester John.

References

1973 American novels
American fantasy novels
Works originally published in Adventure (magazine)
Donald M. Grant, Publisher books